James M. Quinby (October 4, 1804 – July 20, 1874) was an American politician who served as the Mayor of Newark from 1851 to 1854.

References

1804 births
1874 deaths
Mayors of Newark, New Jersey
New Jersey Republicans
People from Orange, New Jersey